John Edward Musker (born November 8, 1953) is an American animator, film director, screenwriter, and film producer. He often collaborates with fellow director Ron Clements and is best known for writing and directing the Disney films The Great Mouse Detective (1986), The Little Mermaid (1989), Aladdin (1992), Hercules (1997), Treasure Planet (2002), The Princess and the Frog (2009), and Moana (2016).

Life and career
Musker was born in Chicago, Illinois, the second oldest of eight children in an Irish Catholic family. His father, Robert J. Musker, who worked for over 40 years at Illinois Bell Telephone, died in 2008 at the age of 84, and his mother, Joan T. Musker (née Lally), died in 2011 at the age of 81.

He attended Loyola Academy in Illinois and then graduated from the Weinberg College of Arts and Sciences at Northwestern University, where he majored in English and drew cartoons for the Daily Northwestern. After that, he served a two-year apprenticeship with famed animator Frank Thomas, a supervising animator of Disney films such as Peter Pan (1953), Lady and the Tramp (1955), and The Aristocats (1970). Musker met Ron Clements during the production of The Fox and the Hound in 1981, where he worked as a character animator under Clements and Cliff Nordberg. Musker teamed up with Clements as story artists on The Black Cauldron before they were removed from the project.

Following the green-lighting of Clements's pitch for an adaptation of the children's book series Basil of Baker Street by Eve Titus into an animated feature, Musker and fellow story artist Burny Mattinson were assigned as the original directors while Dave Michener was brought in as an additional director. Due to a shortened production schedule and multiple story rewrites, Roy E. Disney assigned Mattinson to serve as director/producer while Ron Clements was brought in as another director. 
   
While working on The Great Mouse Detective, newly appointed Disney CEO and chairman Michael Eisner and Jeffrey Katzenberg issued invitations to the animation staff for their first held "gong show" session. Demanding only five new ideas, Clements pitched an adaptation of Hans Christian Andersen's The Little Mermaid and a high-concept idea of Treasure Island in Space, which were both rejected by Katzenberg and Eisner. The next morning, Katzenberg approached Clements and asked him to expand his initial treatment.

With The Little Mermaid in production in 1986, Musker joined Clements in expanding the original treatment into a twenty-page rough script, eliminating the role of the mermaid's grandmother and expanding the roles of the Merman King and the sea witch, and were later joined by Off-Broadway musical composers Howard Ashman and Alan Menken who collaborated on the song and musical score. Released in November 1989, The Little Mermaid was praised as a milestone in rebirth of Disney animation by film critics and collected a domestic gross of $84 million, cumulatively receiving $184.2 million worldwide.

When work on The Little Mermaid was wrapped, Clements and Musker re-developed their idea for Treasure Planet, but the studio still expressed disinterest. Instead, the two directors were offered three projects in development: Swan Lake, King of the Jungle, and Aladdin. The directors eventually chose the latter, desiring a wacky, faster-paced, and more contemporary mood separate from the previous Disney animated films.

Working from Ashman and Menken's treatment and musical score, the two delivered a story reel to Katzenberg in April 1991, which was strongly disapproved of. Jettisoning multiple characters and story ideas and adding Ted Elliott and Terry Rossio as co-screenwriters, the production team restructured the entire story in eight days. Released in November 1992, Aladdin received positive reviews from critics, and became the first animated film to gross over $200 million domestically.

Following work on Aladdin, Clements, along with Musker, resumed their work on Treasure Planet, which was again turned down by Katzenberg in 1993, who disapproved of setting the adaptation of a classic adventure tale in outer space. A deal was struck with the two directors to create another commercial film before he would approve Treasure Planet. Rejecting projects in development such as Don Quixote, The Odyssey, and Around the World in Eighty Days, they were later informed of animator Joe Haidar's pitch for a Hercules feature, and signed onto the project.

During production on Hercules, in 1995, Clements and Musker signed a seven-year contract deal with the studio which stipulated following Hercules, the studio would produce Treasure Planet or another project of their choosing. 

With Treasure Planet completed in 2002, Clements and Musker later inherited Fraidy Cat, which was originally a project developed by Dutch animation director Piet Kroon.  Fraidy Cat, however, never saw its light of day, as David Stainton, then-president of Walt Disney Feature Animation, refused to green-light the project. It was soon followed with Clements and Musker's resignation from Walt Disney Feature Animation in September 2005.

When John Lasseter was appointed chief creative officer over Walt Disney Feature Animation in February 2006, he invited Clements and Musker back to Disney to oversee production on The Frog Princess, and were officially confirmed as directors in the following July. Later re-titled The Princess and the Frog, the film received positive reviews and grossed $267 million worldwide.

After directing The Princess and the Frog, Clements and Musker started working on an adaptation of Terry Pratchett's Mort, but obtaining the film rights prevented them from continuing with the project. To avoid similar problems, they pitched three new ideas, where by 2011, the two directors started developing the film based on an original idea. In late 2012, the duo announced that they will be directing a new film in the future, but they have their lips sealed for the title, the plot, and the animation style.

In July 2013, it was revealed that the film, titled Moana, would be "a Polynesian tale involving the island folk and the idols made famous the world over". On November 10, 2014, Disney confirmed Moana would be released on November 23, 2016.

In March 2018, having worked at Disney for 40 years, Musker announced his retirement from Walt Disney Animation Studios. He is currently animating his own original short film by hand.

Personal life
Musker is married to Gale. They have twin sons, Jackson and Patrick, and a daughter, Julia. He also has sisters by the names of Pat and Colleen.

Filmography

Feature films

Short films

Documentaries

Awards and nominations

Collaborations

John Musker and Ron Clements have cast certain actors in more than one of their films.

References

Bibliography

External links

1953 births
Animators from Illinois
American people of Irish descent
American animated film directors
American animated film producers
Animation screenwriters
Living people
Artists from Chicago
California Institute of the Arts alumni
Film directors from Illinois
Walt Disney Animation Studios people
Northwestern University alumni
Annie Award winners
American film producers